Robert Bednarek (born February 23, 1979 in Bydgoszcz) is a Polish footballer (left defender).

Career

Club
Bednarek has previously played for Amica Wronki and Korona Kielce in the Ekstraklasa.

He was released from Arka Gdynia on 30 June 2011.

References

External links
 

Polish footballers
Amica Wronki players
Korona Kielce players
Arka Gdynia players
Ekstraklasa players
1979 births
Living people
Sportspeople from Bydgoszcz
Association football defenders